Holyoke Saint Patrick's Day Parade is hosted every year on the Sunday of the week of Saint Patrick's Day. Each parade usually attracts around 400,000 spectators from all over the United States of America. Past participants have included President John F. Kennedy, two Speakers of the House and other notable officials.

History

Drawing on the Irish heritage of Holyoke, in its earliest days known as "Ireland Parish", the inaugural Saint Patrick's Day Parade was hosted on March 16, 1952, after a group of local businessmen met at the local Brian Boru Club and proposed the idea. Since that time the Holyoke Saint Patrick's Parade Committee which has since grown to more than 100 people and presents multiple awards to distinguished citizens every year.

As with the United States at-large, the parade has been widely participated in by people both of Irish and non-Irish heritage alike, and has come to be a reflection of Holyoke's syncretic culture, an example being local vendors selling such combinations as Café con leche with Irish soda bread, and wide variety of bands participating from all over the country, including but not limited to, the Aqua String Band, the Hawthorne Callaberos, and the Tian Guo Marching Band. Citing concerns about the coronavirus pandemic, in 2020 the parade and several associated events were cancelled for the first time in its 68 year run.

Attendance
Parade Spectator Estimates By Year (1952–Present)

Since its inaugural event in 1952, the parade has grown substantially; while the first parade saw around an estimated 25,000 spectators, in recent years the estimated number of spectator's has exceeding 400,000, approximately ten times the population of Holyoke as of the most recent census. The event, considered as much a regional as local venue, attracts many spectators from surrounding states and even Ireland itself in recent years. In 2011 the UMass Donahue Institute estimated the parade brought in $20 million annually to the local economy, through its participants and spectators.

Honorees

Each year since its first iteration, the parade has had a parade president and grand marshal; in 1955 the first Colleen was chosen and given her own court and throne. Over the years a number of other awards have been created, including the Thomas Rohan Award (1957), named for the first grand marshall, for citizens contributing outstanding work to the parade; the John F. Kennedy Award (1958), named for its inaugural recipient, has been given to an "Outstanding American of Irish Descent" each year since that time and has included nationally known singers, actors, athletes, writers, an astronaut, mayors of Boston, several governors, senators, and Speakers of the House. Additional awards include the Citizenship Award (1966) honoring those of non-Irish descent who have made substantial contributions to the parade, the George E. O’Connell Award (1963) to members of the parade committee who have made longstanding efforts to fundraising, the Daniel J. Gallivan Award (1972) for others who have made significant contributions to the parade who do not reside in Holyoke, and the Ambassador Award (1992) to those who promote international ties between the United States and Ireland.

Media coverage
The parade also enjoys an audience beyond its participants, with more than 1.2 million viewers watching over the channel and online streams of local PBS affiliate WGBY, which broadcast it every year from 2001 through 2018. WWLP resumed as the broadcaster of the parade in 2019 through its CW channel, and also included a livestream. Other local media outlets including WGGB-TV and the Springfield Republican also cover the event.

Gallery

See also
 History of the Irish in Holyoke
 Holyoke Caledonian Pipe Band, regular feature in the parade since the first and oldest continuously operating pipe band in North America
 Saint Patrick's Day

References

Further reading

External links

 Official website, Holyoke St. Patrick's Committee
 WGBY Official Stream, WGBY-57 PBS Springfield
Holyoke St Patrick's Parade: Behind the Scenes, WGBY video chronicling setup of parade in 2010

Parade Committees

Surrounding municipality committees organized to send delegations of honored persons, floats, and community groups as contingents to the parade-
 Agawam St. Patrick's Committee
 Chicopee St. Patrick's Parade Committee
 Greater Easthampton St. Patrick's Day Committee, representing Easthampton and Southampton
 Northampton St. Patrick's Association
 Springfield St. Patrick's Committee
 Sons of Erin, organizing Westfield's Parade Contingent
 St. Patrick's Committee of West Springfield

March events
Parades in the United States
Holyoke, Massachusetts
Irish-American culture in Massachusetts
Saint Patrick's Day